Ameles decolor is a species of praying mantis native to the west Mediterranean.

Mating 
The courtship behavior of A. decolor is considered one of the most complex compared to other species of mantis. When mating, males will begin with a pattern of abdominal movements while performing a lateral "boxing" (side-to-side motion) with their prothoracic legs. A. decolor will also perform a series of stamping movements with their metathoracic legs, although it is unknown if these movements are connected to courtship behavior or incidentally occur. Individual components of A. decolor 's ritual have been observed in Tenodera aridifolia sinensis and Oxypilus hamatus during their mating rituals. Tenodera aridifolia has been observed to engage in a similar mating ritual, indicating both a common ancestor and that the behavior originated when the species' ancestors diverged. Females have been observed performing deimatic (startle) displays during courtship.

Males have been observed to follow two separate approaches when courting females. The first approach, the "vigorous approach", involves fast rotation of the forelegs and a wide bend in the abdomen. The second approach, the "shy approach", involves slowly moving towards a female with slow, side-to-side oscillations in the forelegs. This shy approach has been observed in other species of mantis. It has been theorized that, since mantises observe slow objects as further away, males may engage in "shy" behavior as a way to avoid predation by the larger females. During their approach, males will tap the ground to indicate a desire to mate, and once they have closed the distance, males will spread their forelegs and enlarge themselves. This is designed to discourage an attack by the female. Sexual cannibalism has been observed in the species but only before the initiation of courtship rituals, indicating that courtship significantly decreases the risk of the males being consumed. When coupling, the male will attempt to make a flying leap onto the female's back, engaging in mating movements similar to that seen in Tenodera aridifolia. During mating, males often tap antennae to calm the female and other males may attempt to uncouple mating pairs and mate with the female themselves.

References

decolor
Mantodea of Africa
Mantodea of Europe
Insects described in 1825